The Barley River is a tributary of the eastern bank of the upper part of the Malbaie River, flowing in the unorganized territory of Lac-Pikauba, in the Charlevoix Regional County Municipality, in the administrative region of Capitale-Nationale, in the province of Quebec, in Canada. This watercourse successively crosses zec des Martres, then the Laurentides Wildlife Reserve.

The lower part of this valley is served by the route 381. The upper part is served by the forest road R0305 which passes on the south shore of Barley Lake for the needs of forestry. Forestry is the main economic activity in this valley; recreational tourism, second.

Because of the altitude, the surface of the Barley River is generally frozen from the end of November until the beginning of April; however, safe circulation on the ice is generally from the beginning of December until the end of March. The water level of the river varies with the seasons and the precipitation; the spring flood generally occurs in April.

Geography 
The Barley River originates from Lake Wabano landlocked between mountains, located in a forest area in the unorganized territory of Lac-Pikauba in the zec des Martres. The mouth of Lake Wabano is located to the southwest, at:
  south-west of the confluence of the rivière des Martres and the Malbaie River;
  west of La Malbaie town center;
  north-west of Baie-Saint-Paul town center.

  west, in particular by crossing on  the Lesclache Lake (length:  in the north–south direction;), to its mouth;
  west, in particular by crossing Barley Lake (length:  including a peninsula stretching on  northward;) in its full length, up to the dam at its mouth;
  the southwest by forming a small loop towards the north to collect the discharge (coming from the north) of Évanturel Lake, crossing a zone of rapids, then crossing Lac du Coq (length : ;) over its full length, up to the dam at its mouth. Note: Lac du Coq receives from the southeast the discharge of three small lakes;
  to the southwest by crossing a series of rapids and collecting a stream (coming from the north), then to the west by crossing two series of rapids, to the discharge (from the south) of Petit lac Barley;
  north-west, up to the outlet (coming from the north-east) of Lac Joncas;
  north-west across a series of rapids, to its mouth.

The Barley River flows onto the west bank of the Malbaie River, in the unorganized territory of Lac-Pikauba, in the Laurentides Wildlife Reserve. This mouth is located at:

  east of a mountain peak;
  downstream of the mouth of the Petite rivière Malbaie;
  north-west of downtown Baie-Saint-Paul;
  west of downtown La Malbaie.

Toponymy 
During the history the spelling of this toponym knew the variants: Berly, Berley and in Berley. In 1927, the current Barley spelling was finally fixed. This toponym evokes the life work of Pierre Berly, Amerindian of Abenaki origin who camped in the region. He operated at the outlet of the lake a trout pit known as "Trou à Berly". The toponym "Lac Barley" appears under the spelling "Lac Berley", named after an old Abenaki, Pierre Berley, in the work of Thomas Fortin, The last of the coureurs de bois, by Damase Potvin, 1945, page 211. This toponymic denomination was approved on 1963-07-03 by the Commission of geography of Quebec.

The toponym "Rivière Barley" was formalized on December 5, 1968 at the Place Names Bank of the Commission de toponymie du Québec.

Notes and references

Appendices

Related articles 
 Charlevoix Regional County Municipality
 Lac-Pikauba, an unorganized territory
 Zec des Martres, a controlled harvesting zone
 Laurentides Wildlife Reserve
 Barley Lake
 Lesclache Lake
 Évanturel Lake
 Malbaie River
 St. Lawrence River
 List of rivers of Quebec

External links 

Rivers of Capitale-Nationale
Charlevoix Regional County Municipality
Laurentides Wildlife Reserve